Tyke is a masculine given name. Notable people with the name include:

 Tyke Peacock (born 1961), American high jumper
 Tyke Tolbert (born 1967), American football player and coach

Masculine given names